Ossala-Lesisko  (till December 31, 2001 as at Osala-Lesisko and then contemporary collaterant name of locality as at Ossala-Lesisko after the official law) is a village in the administrative district of Gmina Osiek, within Staszów County, Świętokrzyskie Voivodeship, in south-central Poland.

The village has a population of  71.

Demography 
According to the 2002 Poland census, there were 73 people residing in Ossala-Lesisko village, of whom 57.5% were male and 42.5% were female. In the village, the population was spread out, with 21.9% under the age of 18, 31.5% from 18 to 44, 20.6% from 45 to 64, and 26% who were 65 years of age or older.
 Figure 1. Population pyramid of village in 2002 — by age group and sex

References

Ossala-Lesisko